The Williams Valley School District is a small, rural public school district located in Dauphin County, Pennsylvania and Schuylkill County, Pennsylvania. The district is highly fragmented, encompassing the boroughs of Williamstown and Tower City as well as the townships of Porter, Rush, Williams, and Wiconisco.

According to 2000 federal census data, it served a resident population of 7,355. By 2010, the district's population increased to 7,463 people. The educational attainment levels for the School District population (25 years old and over) were 86.2% high school graduates and 11.5% college graduates.

According to the Pennsylvania Budget and Policy Center, 67.1% of the district's pupils lived at 185% or below the Federal Poverty level as shown by their eligibility for the federal free or reduced price school meal programs in 2012. In 2009, the district residents’ per capita income was $16,846, while the median family income was $41,005. In the Commonwealth, the median family income was $49,501 and the United States median family income was $49,445, in 2010. In Schuylkill County, the median household income was $42,315. By 2013, the median household income in the United States rose to $52,100.

Williams Valley School District operates one elementary school and one combined junior/senior high school, both of which are located in Tower City. High school students may choose to attend Schuylkill Technology Centers for training in the construction and mechanical trades. The Schuylkill Intermediate Unit IU29 provides the district with a wide variety of services like specialized education for disabled students and hearing, speech and visual disability services and professional development for staff and faculty.

Extracurriculars
Williams Valley School District offers a variety of clubs, activities and an extensive sports program.

Athletics
The district has athletic teams in the following sports:

Boys
Baseball - A
Basketball - AA
Football - AA
Soccer - A
Wrestling	- AA

Girls
Basketball - A
Soccer (Fall) - AA
Softball - A
Volleyball - A

Junior High School Sports

Boys
Basketball
Wrestling	

Girls
Basketball
Softball 

According to PIAA directory July 2021

External link
Official website

References

School districts in Dauphin County, Pennsylvania
School districts in Schuylkill County, Pennsylvania